Carmenta chromolaenae is a moth of the family Sesiidae. It is native to Venezuela, but was introduced to South Africa for the biological control of Siam weed (Chromolaena odorata).

The length of the forewings is 4–7 mm.

The larvae feed on Chromolaena odorata.

References

Sesiidae
Moths of Africa
Moths described in 2009